Neshama Carlebach (born October 9, 1974) is an American teacher, entertainer, singer, and the protégé of her late father, Shlomo Carlebach. Her career as a recording artist and as an occasional essayist has reached interfaith communities and has addressed social issues in America, Israel and Jewish communities spanning the world. While her spiritual origins were within the Orthodox Jewish community, she has also found a community in the Reform Jewish movement and beyond.

Career
Carlebach has performed and taught in cities worldwide, has sung on the Broadway stage, has sold more than one million records, has sparked public conversation about the place of women in Judaism, the importance of religious pluralism, and her own experiences as a woman. She was a six-time entrant in the 2011 Grammy Awards. Carlebach was also one of the creators of the Broadway play Soul Doctor.

In November 2016, Carlebach was inducted into the Brooklyn Hall of Fame, where she received a Certificate of Congressional Recognition for her work.

Carlebach married noted social activist and author Rabbi Menachem Creditor in 2018.

Discography
Soul (1996)
Ha Neshama Shel Shlomo (1997)
Dancing With My Soul (2000)
Ani Shelach (2001)
Journey (2004)
One and One (2008)
Higher & Higher (2010)
Every Little Soul Must Shine (2011)
Soul Daughter (2015)
Believe (2019)

References

External links

Neshama Carlebach shares her father’s musical legacy by Sheldon Kirshner, Canadian Jewish News, January 29, 2009.

1974 births
Living people
Neshama
Jewish American musicians
21st-century American singers
Jewish women musicians